Jazz Goes to the Movies is an album by American jazz arranger and conductor Manny Albam recorded in 1962 for the Impulse! label.

Reception
The Allmusic review by Ken Dryden awarded the album 4 stars stating "fans of old movie music arranged by a talent like Albam are advised to keep an eye out for it".

Track listing
 "Exodus" (Ernest Gold) – 5:10 
 "High Noon (Do Not Forsake Me)" (Dimitri Tiomkin, Ned Washington) – 2:44 
 "Paris Blues" (Duke Ellington) – 2:42 
 "La Dolce Vita" (Nino Rota) – 2:40 
 "Majority of One" (Max Steiner) – 2:05 
 "Green Leaves of Summer" (Tiomkin, Paul Francis Webster) – 5:56 
 "Guns of Navarone" (Tiomkin) – 3:26 
 "El Cid" (Miklós Rózsa) – 2:25 
 "Slowly" (Kermit Goell, David Raksin) – 4:53 
Recorded in New York City on January 12, 1962 (track 8), January 26, 1962 (tracks 1, 3, 5 & 6) and February 12, 1962 (tracks 2, 4, 7 & 9)

Personnel
Manny Albam – arranger, conductor
John Bello (tracks 1, 3, 5 & 6), Johnny Coles (tracks 1, 3, 5, 6 & 8), Al DeRisi (tracks 1, 3, 5, 6 & 8), Bernie Glow (track 8), Joe Mewman (tracks 1, 3, 5 & 6), Nick Travis (tracks 2, 4 & 7-9) – trumpet 
Clark Terry – trumpet, flugelhorn (tracks 2, 4, 7 & 9)
Wayne Andre (tracks 1, 3, 5 & 6), Willie Dennis (tracks 1, 3, 5, 6 & 8), Bill Elton (track 8), Urbie Green (track 8), Alan Raph (tracks 1, 3, 5, 6 & 8) – trombone 
Bob Brookmeyer – valve trombone (tracks 1-7 & 9)
Julius Watkins – french horn (tracks 2, 4, 7 & 9)
Harvey Phillips – tuba (tracks 2, 4, 7 & 9)
Gene Quill (tracks 1, 3, 5 & 6), Phil Woods (tracks 1, 3, 5, 6 & 8) – alto saxophone
Oliver Nelson (tracks 1-9), Frank Socolow (tracks 1, 3, 5 & 6) – tenor saxophone
Gene Allen – baritone saxophone (tracks 1-7 & 9)
George Devens – vibes (track 8)
Eddie Costa – piano, vibes (tracks 1-7 & 9)
Jim Hall (tracks 1, 3, 5, 6 & 8), Jimmy Raney (tracks 2, 4, 7 & 9) – guitar 
Bill Crow (tracks 1-7 & 9), George Duvivier (track 8) – bass 
Gus Johnson – drums (tracks 1-9)

References

Impulse! Records albums
Manny Albam albums
1962 albums
Albums arranged by Manny Albam
Albums conducted by Manny Albam